This is a list of settlements in the Kastoria regional unit, Macedonia, Greece.

 Agia Kyriaki
 Agios Antonios
 Agios Ilias
 Ammoudara
 Ampelokipoi
 Argos Orestiko
 Asprokklisia
 Avgi
 Chalara
 Chiliodendro
 Chionato
 Chrysi
 Dendrochori
 Dialekto
 Dipotamia
 Dispilio
 Eptachori
 Gavros
 Germas
 Gramos 
 Ieropigi
 Kalochori
 Kastanofyto
 Kastoria 
 Kleisoura
 Komninades
 Korisos
 Koromilia
 Kostarazi
 Kotyli
 Kranionas
 Kypseli
 Lagka
 Lakkomata
 Lefki
 Lithia
 Makrochori
 Maniakoi
 Mavrochori
 Mavrokampos
 Melanthio
 Melas
 Melissotopos
 Mesopotamia
 Metamorfosi
 Militsa
 Nestorio
 Nostimo
 Oinoi
 Omorfokklisia
 Oxya
 Pentavryso
 Polyanemo
 Polykarpi
 Polykeraso
 Ptelea
 Pteria
 Sidirochori
 Spilaia
 Spilios
 Toichio
 Tsakoni
 Vasileiada
 Vogatsiko
 Vrachos
 Vyssinia
 Zouzouli

By municipality

See also
List of towns and villages in Greece

Kastoria